Hirticallia hirsuta is a species of beetle in the family Cerambycidae, and the only species in the genus Hirticallia. It was described by Galileo and Martins in 1990.

References

Calliini
Beetles described in 1990
Monotypic beetle genera